Tommaso Cucchietti (born 24 January 1998) is an Italian footballer who plays as a goalkeeper for  club Lucchese.

Club career

Torino 
Cucchetti is a youth product of Torino youth team. He made several appearances on the bench for almost the entire 2016–17 season, but he never appear on the field.

Loan to Reggina 
On 13 July 2017, Cucchietti was loaned to Serie C club Reggina on a season-long loan deal. On 2 September he made his professional debut for Reggina in Serie C in a 1–0 away defeat against Catanzaro. On 23 September he kept his first clean sheet for the team in a 1–0 away win over Fondi. Three weeks later, on 14 October, he kept his second clean sheet for the club in a 2–0 home win over Fidelis Andria and, three more weeks later, on 4 November, he kept his third clean sheet in a 0–0 away draw against Casertana. On 26 March 2018, Cucchietti kept his 10th clean sheet of the season for Reggina in a 0–0 away draw against Siracusa. Cucchietti ended his loan to Reggina with 34 appearances, 11 clean sheets and 36 goals conceded.

Loan to Alessandria 
On 28 July 2018, Cucchietti was signed by Serie C side Alessandria on a season-long loan. One day later, on 29 July, he made his debut for the club in a 1–0 home defeat against Giana Erminio in the first round of Coppa Italia. On 16 September he made his Serie C debut for Alessandria in a 2–1 away win over Juventus U23. Two weeks later, on 30 September, Cucchietti kept his first clean sheet in a 0–0 home draw against Lucchese. One more week later, on 7 October, he kept his second consecutive clean sheet, a 0–0 away draw against Pisa and, ten days later, on 17 October, he kept his third clean sheet, another 0–0 draw against Olbia. Cucchietti ended his loan to Alessandria with 32 appearances, 42 goals conceded and 8 clean sheets.

Loan to Südtirol 
On 26 July 2019, Cuccchietti was loaned to Serie C club Südtirol on a season-long loan deal. One week later, on 4 August, he made his debut for the club in a 4–2 home win over Città di Fasano in the first round of Coppa Italia. On 25 August, Cucchietti made his league debut in a 2–1 away win over Vis Pesaro. On 21 September he kept his first clean sheet for the club in a 1–0 away win against Arzignano Valchiampo. Four days later, on 25 September, he kept his second clean sheet in a 3–0 home win over Fermana and four more days later, on 29 September, his third consecutive in a 2–0 away win over Alma Juventus Fano. Cucchietti ended his season-long loan to Südtirol with 24 appearances, 26 goals conceded and 9 clean sheet.

Gubbio 
On 19 August 2020, Cucchietti joined to Serie C club Gubbio on an undisclosed fee and he signed a 2-year contract. Five weeks later, on 27 September, he made his debut for the club as a starter in a 2–0 home defeat against Modena. One month later, on 25 October he kept his first clean sheet for the club in a 0–0 home draw over Legnago Salus. On 21 November, Cucchietti kept his second clean sheet for Gubbio in a 0–0 away draw against Perugia and two days later his third in a 1–0 home win over Triestina.

Lucchese 
On 11 August 2021, he signed a two-year contract with Lucchese. He started the 2020–21 season as a back-up to Jacopo Coletta, appearing only once in the first 15 games of the season and allowing 3 goals in that game.

International career 
Cucchietti represented Italy from Under-16 to Under-19 level. On 11 March 2014 he made his debut at Under-16 level in a 2–1 away win over Croatia U-16, one month later he kept his first clean sheet at this level in a 3–0 home win over Poland U-16. On 27 August 2014, Cucchietti made his debut and kept his clean sheet at Under-17 level in a 0–0 away draw against Portugal U-17. Cucchetti, with Italy U-17, played also 2 matches in the 2015 UEFA European Under-17 Championship qualification against Slovakia U-17 and Germany U-17. On 16 September 2015 he made his debut at U-18 level in a 3–2 away defeat against Czech Republic U-18. On 11 August 2016, Cucchietti made his debut at U-19 level, as a substitute replacing Mattia Del Favero in a 1–0 away defeat against Croatia U-19.

Career statistics

Club

Honours

Club 
Torino Primavera
 Supercoppa Primavera: 2015

References

External links
 

1998 births
Living people
Footballers from Turin
Italian footballers
Association football goalkeepers
Serie C players
Torino F.C. players
Reggina 1914 players
U.S. Alessandria Calcio 1912 players
F.C. Südtirol players
A.S. Gubbio 1910 players
Lucchese 1905 players
Italy youth international footballers